Liu Wei (born June 1965) is a Chinese politician, currently serving as deputy party secretary of Beijing. He previously served as vice governor of Henan, vice minister of Emergency Management, and deputy party secretary of Jilin.

He is a representative of the 20th National Congress of the Chinese Communist Party and a member of the 20th Central Committee of the Chinese Communist Party.

Biography
Liu was born in Zhecheng County, Henan, in June 1965. In 1980, he entered Shangqiu Normal School (now Shangqiu Normal University), where he majored in chemistry. After graduating in 1983, Liu taught at Zhecheng County High School. In March 1985, he became a technician at Zhecheng County Fertilizer Plant. He did his postgraduate work at the Department of Chemistry, Zhengzhou University from August 1987 to July 1990. He also received his doctor's degree in economic from Fudan University in June 2004.

Liu got involved in politics in July 1990, when he was despatched as an official in the Henan Provincial Petrochemical Department (now Henan Provincial Petrochemical Industry Management Office), where he eventually became deputy director in June 2000. He joined the Chinese Communist Party (CCP) in June 1997. Liu was assigned to Henan Development and Reform Commission in February 2004. He moved up the ranks to become deputy director in August 2004 and director in January 2007. He also served as vice governor of Henan from January 2018 to January 2020 and party secretary of the CCP Henan Provincial State owned Assets Supervision and Administration Commission Committee from March 2018 to November 2018.

In January 2020, Liu was transferred to the central government and appointed vice minister of Emergency Management, a position at vice-ministerial level.

In April 2022, Liu was appointed deputy party secretary of Jilin, succeeding Gao Guangbin.

In December 29, 2022, Liu was appointed deputy party secretary of Beijing, succeeding Yin Yong.

References

1965 births
Living people
People from Zhecheng County
Shangqiu Normal University alumni
Zhengzhou University alumni
Fudan University alumni
People's Republic of China politicians from Henan
Chinese Communist Party politicians from Henan
Members of the 20th Central Committee of the Chinese Communist Party